Esher and Walton is a constituency in Surrey represented in the House of Commons of the UK Parliament. Since 2010, it has been represented by Dominic Raab of the Conservative Party, who is the Deputy Prime Minister of the United Kingdom, Lord Chancellor and Secretary of State for Justice.

Constituency profile 
The constituency is in the north of Surrey in the affluent London commuter belt. It is partly rural, with heathland and reservoirs, as well as towns such as Esher and Walton-on-Thames, and lower density Cobham, Claygate and Molesey and the villages of Oxshott, Thames Ditton and Hinchley Wood. The constituency occupies all but the far west of the Borough of Elmbridge. A majority of its housing is on private planned estates.  The South West Main Line passes through the middle of the seat, with fast trains to central London. The constituency has low unemployment and has traditionally been regarded as one of the Conservative Party's safest seats in the UK. The area of the seat includes the last non-tidal section of the River Thames, wooded Esher Commons, the River Mole and Sandown Park racecourse.

Boundaries 
Since the constituency's creation in 1997 it has consisted of the Borough of Elmbridge wards of Claygate, Cobham and Downside, Cobham Fairmile, Esher, Hersham North, Hersham South, Hinchley Wood, Long Ditton, Molesey East, Molesey North, Molesey South, Oxshott and Stoke D'Abernon, Thames Ditton, Walton Ambleside, Walton Central, Walton North, Walton South, Weston Green.

Members of Parliament 
Ian Taylor held the seat from 1997 to 2010, having held the previous Esher seat from 1987. Taylor stood down at the 2010 election, and Dominic Raab was elected as the new Conservative MP for this seat.

History 

The last time a component of this area voted for an MP who was not Conservative was in 1906, when a Liberal MP served the four-year term to 1910 for Chertsey, representing the Walton-on-Thames part of the current seat.

In the 2019 general election, 60 seats, including this seat, were written into the Remain Alliance, an agreement between the Liberal Democrats, the Green Party and Plaid Cymru not to vie against one another in those seats. These were parties opposed to Britain's departure from the European Union. In consequence, Laura Harmour, who had been lined up to fight the seat for the Green Party, did not stand.  Axel Thill, the candidate selected for the Brexit Party, was one of those withdrawn by party leader Nigel Farage before nominations closed, when Farage decided not to field candidates in Conservative-held seats. This was done to avoid the potential for pro-Remain parties winning seats and holding a People's Vote on Brexit.

The seat, long considered safe for the Conservatives, was heavily targeted by the Liberal Democrats, particularly because the incumbent Conservative, Dominic Raab, had campaigned for a Leave vote in the EU referendum. The constituency itself voted in favour of remaining in the EU and is socially similar to the two Greater London seats it borders, namely Twickenham and Kingston & Surbiton, which are both strongholds for the Lib Dems. This resulted in a large swing to the Liberal Democrats of 18.5%, reducing the seat's majority to make it a marginal for the first time since its creation.

Elections

Elections in the 2010s 
In 2019, Esher and Walton was one of five English seats (the others being Cheltenham, East Devon, Westmorland and Lonsdale, and Winchester) where the Labour candidate failed to get over 5% votes cast so lost the deposit.

Elections in the 2000s

Elections in the 1990s

See also 
List of parliamentary constituencies in Surrey

Notes

References

Sources 
Election result, 2015 (BBC)
Election result, 2010 (BBC)
Election result, 2005 (BBC)
Election results, 1997–2001 (BBC)
Election results, 1997–2001 (Election Demon)

Borough of Elmbridge
Parliamentary constituencies in South East England
Politics of Surrey
Constituencies of the Parliament of the United Kingdom established in 1997